The Mayor of Gloucester, Massachusetts has been the head of the municipal government in Gloucester, Massachusetts since 1874, with the exception of February 10, 1954 to July 1, 1976 when the head of government was the city manager and the mayor was a ceremonial position appointed by the city council.

List of mayors
This is a list of mayors of Gloucester, Massachusetts.

List of city managers

See also
 Timeline of Gloucester, Massachusetts

References

Gloucester